Zane Robertson (born 14 November 1989) is a New Zealand middle and long-distance runner. He lives in Iten, Kenya. At the age of 17 he and his twin brother Jake moved from New Zealand to Iten, Kenya, to further their running careers.

Career
He competed in the 2013 World Championships in Moscow over the 5000 m, where he finished 14th with a time of 13:46.55. At the 2014 IAAF World Indoor Championships, Robertson finished 12th in the final of the 3000 metres event a in a time of 8:01.81 after running a New Zealand National Indoor Record of 7:44.16 in the heats. He won the bronze medal in the 5000 metres at the 2014 Commonwealth Games in Glasgow.

In 2015, Robertson set a New Zealand and Oceanian record in the half marathon with a time of 59:47 at Marugame. Robertson became only the fourth non-African runner in history to run the distance in under one hour.

At the 2016 Rio Olympics Robertson finished 12th in the men's 10000 metres with a time of 27:33.67. The time broke Dick Quax's 39-year-old New Zealand national record by more than 8 seconds.

Robertson was selected to represent New Zealand in both the marathon and 10,000 m at the 2018 Commonwealth Games, and planned to contest one of the two events. However, he withdrew from the team on 5 April 2018, after his training was hampered by a groin injury earlier in the year. At the 2019 Gold Coast Marathon, Robertson placed third in a time of 2:08:19, breaking his brother Jake's national record by seven seconds.

In 2021 Robertson finished 36th in the Tokyo Olympic Games Marathon with a time of 2:17:04.

Personal bests

References

External links

 

1989 births
Living people
Sportspeople from Hamilton, New Zealand
New Zealand male middle-distance runners
Commonwealth Games bronze medallists for New Zealand
Commonwealth Games medallists in athletics
Athletes (track and field) at the 2014 Commonwealth Games
World Athletics Championships athletes for New Zealand
Olympic athletes of New Zealand
Athletes (track and field) at the 2016 Summer Olympics
New Zealand male long-distance runners
New Zealand twins
Athletes (track and field) at the 2020 Summer Olympics
Medallists at the 2014 Commonwealth Games